Events from the year 2001 in Yugoslavia.

Incumbents
President: Vojislav Koštunica 
Prime Minister: Zoran Žižić (until 24 July), Dragiša Pešić (starting 24 July)

Events
 1 April – Arrest in Belgrade of deposed president Slobodan Milošević.
 28 June – Extradition of Slobodan Milošević to The Hague to stand trial for war crimes.

Deaths
 23 April – Fadil Hoxha, politician (born 1916)
 20 October – Nebojša Popović, basketball player (born 1923)
 29 October – Milorad B. Protić, astronomer (born 1910)
 Nada Mamula, singer (born 1927)
 Aleksandar Obradović, composer (born 1927)

References

 
Yugoslavia
2000s in Yugoslavia
Serbia and Montenegro
Yugoslavia